Cordino Esporte Clube, commonly known as Cordino, is a Brazilian football club based in Barra do Corda, Maranhão state. The club competed in the Campeonato Brasileiro Série D once.

Cordino is currently ranked sixth among Maranhão teams in CBF's national club ranking, at 181st place overall.

History
The club was founded on March 8, 2010. The club gained promotion in 2010 to compete in the 2011 Campeonato Maranhense. Cordino debuted in the 2017 Campeonato Brasileiro Série D defeating Santos (AP) 1-0 on May 21, 2017 at Leandrão Stadium.

Stadium
Cordino Esporte Clube play their home games at Estádio Municipal Leandro Cláudio da Silva, nicknamed Leandrão. The stadium has a maximum capacity of 1,400 people.

References

Football clubs in Maranhão
Association football clubs established in 2010
2010 establishments in Brazil